Radziwiłka  is a village in the administrative district of Gmina Młodzieszyn, within Sochaczew County, Masovian Voivodeship, in east-central Poland.

The village has a population of 55.

References

Villages in Sochaczew County